Sickletown was a hamlet in the town of Orangetown in Rockland County, New York, United States.  It was located north of Nauraushaun, east of the state of New Jersey, south of Nanuet, and west of Blauvelt.

History
Sickletown was a hamlet named after the Sickles family located along the east and west side of Sickletown Road, also named after them. A few of the sandstone homes, mostly Pre-Revolutionary, built by the members of the Sickles family remain.

In the early 1870s, Pearl River was divided in five different parts: Sickletown, Nauraushaun, Middletown Pascack and Muddy Brook.

Further reading
Green, Frank Bertangue. MD, The History of Rockland County:

Hamlets in Rockland County, New York
Hamlets in New York (state)
Former populated places in Rockland County, New York